Cerium(III) oxide, also known as cerium oxide, cerium trioxide, cerium sesquioxide, cerous oxide or dicerium trioxide, is an oxide of the rare-earth metal cerium. It has chemical formula  and is gold-yellow in color.

Applications

Engine and exhaust catalysts

Cerium oxide is used as a catalytic converter for the minimisation of CO emissions in the exhaust gases from motor vehicles.

When there is a shortage of oxygen, cerium(IV) oxide is reduced by carbon monoxide to cerium(III) oxide:

When there is an oxygen surplus, the process is reversed and cerium(III) oxide is oxidized to cerium(IV) oxide:

Major automotive applications for cerium(III) oxide are, as a catalytic converter for the oxidation of CO and  emissions in the exhaust gases from motor vehicles, and secondly, cerium oxide finds use as a fuel additive to diesel fuels, which results in increased fuel efficiency and decreased hydrocarbon derived particulate matter emissions, however the health effects of the cerium oxide bearing engine exhaust is a point of study and dispute.

Water splitting
The cerium(IV) oxide–cerium(III) oxide cycle or  cycle is a two step thermochemical water splitting process based on cerium(IV) oxide and cerium(III) oxide for hydrogen production.

Photoluminescence
Cerium(III) oxide combined with tin(II) oxide (SnO) in ceramic form is used for illumination with UV light. It absorbs light with a wavelength of 320 nm and emits light with a wavelength of 412 nm. This combination of cerium(III) oxide and tin(II) oxide is rare, and obtained only with difficulty on a laboratory scale.

Production
Samples produced in this way are only slowly air-oxidized back to the dioxide at room temperature.

References

External links
Transformation of CeO2(1 1 1) to Ce2O3(0 0 0 1) films

Cerium(III) compounds
Sesquioxides